12.10 is a 1919 British silent thriller film directed by Herbert Brenon and starring Marie Doro, Ben Webster, and Geoffrey Kerr. It was the first film made by British & Colonial Kinematograph Company which had ambitious plans to break into the American market. It was made at Walthamstow Studios, and had considerable success on its release.

Plot
As described in a film magazine, Louis Fernando fails to sell a patent upon which he has spent the better part of his life and drowns himself. His orphaned child Marie (Doro) is adopted by Lord Chatterton (Webster). Geoffrey Brooke (Kerr), who is in the employ of Lord Chatterton, falls in love with Marie. Chatterton's general manager Arthur Newton (Carew) also loves Marie and formulates a scheme whereby he hopes to win her and also acquire the Chatterton fortune. Chatterton becomes suspicious and by a ruse traps Newton and exposes his plot. Marie and Geoffrey are made happy in the end.

Cast
 Marie Doro as Marie Fernando
 Ben Webster as Lord Chatterton
 Geoffrey Kerr as Geoffrey Brooke
 James Carew as Arthur Newton
 Frederick Kerr as Doctor Wrightman
 Pierre Maillard

References

Bibliography
 Low, Rachel. The History of British Film: Volume IV, 1918–1929. Routledge, 1997.

External links

1919 films
British thriller films
British silent feature films
1910s thriller films
1910s English-language films
Films directed by Herbert Brenon
Films shot at Walthamstow Studios
British black-and-white films
Silent thriller films
1910s British films